Cherry Ridge is a mountain located in the Catskill Mountains of New York southeast of Hancock. Taylor Hill is located west, Big Fork Mountain is located north, and Rattlesnake Hill is located northwest of Cherry Ridge.

References

Mountains of Delaware County, New York
Mountains of New York (state)